Maloji Bhosale was a Maratha sardar (general) who served the Ahmadnagar Sultanate in Malik Ambar's army. He was the father of Shahaji and the grandfather of Chhatrapati Shivaji, the founder of the Maratha Empire.

Early life 

Maloji was born in 1552 to Babaji Bhosale (d. 1597), a patil (chief) of the Hingni Berdi and Devalgaon villages around Pune. Maloji had a younger brother, Vithoji.

Military career under the Jadhavs of Sindkhed 
Maloji and his brother Vithoji migrated away from Pune, and initially served as petty horsemen under the Jadhavs of Sindkhed. The Jadhavs provided military service to the Ahmednagar Sultanate.
Maloji married Uma Bai (also known as Dipa Bai), the sister of Jagpalrao Nimbalkar, who was the deshmukh of Phaltan
 

According to Shivabharata, composed by Shivaji's court poet Paramananda, Maloji's wife Umabai prayed to the Sufi Pir Shah Sharif of Ahmadnagar to bless her with a son. She gave birth to two sons, who were named Shahaji and Sharifji after the Pir.

According to one account, during a Holi function, the Jadhav chief Lakhuji remarked, in a lighter vein, that his daughter Jijabai and Shahaji would make a fine couple. Maloji took Lakhuji's remark seriously, and announced publicly that his son was engaged to Lakhuji's daughter. This irked Lakhuji, who considered Maloji to be a non-noble Shiledar. He dismissed Maloji from his services. Later, Nimbalkar's influence and the rising status of the Bhosale family helped Shahaji marry Jijabai.

Ahmednagar Sultanate service 

According to one account, Maloji and Vithoji once found a treasure while tilling a field and became rich. They raised a small troop, and briefly harassed Lakhuji.

In 1577, like the Nimbalkars, the two brothers joined the service of the Ahmednagar Sultanate, under Murtaza Nizam Shah I. Maloji became a trusted aide of Malik Amber, who rose to the Prime Ministership of the Ahmadnagar Sultanate. Maloji's cousins, the Ghorpades of Mudhol, also became successful noblemen, serving the rival Sultanate of Bijapur.

Maloji rose rapidly in the service of Malik Ambar, fighting against the rival Deccan Sultanates and the Mughals. He and his brother were granted the control of three parganas (administrative units): Elur (Verul), Derhadi and Kannarad (including Jategau and Vakadi), beside several small towns and villages. In 1595 or 1599, Maloji was given the title of raja by Bahadur Nizam Shah, the ruler of the Ahmednagar Sultanate. On the recommendation of Malik Ambar, he was given the jagir of Pune and Supe parganas, along with the control of the Shivneri and Chakan forts. Maloji carried out the restoration of the Grishneshwar temple near Verul, and also constructed a large tank at the Shambhu Mahadev temple in Shikhar Shingnapur.

Death 

Maloji died during a battle against the Bijapur Sultanate, at Indapur. One account puts his year of death as 1606, and mentions that his son Shahaji, five-years old at the time, was raised by his brother Vithoji. Other accounts put the year of his death as 1620 or 1622. After his death, his jagir was transferred to his son Shahaji.

References 

1552 births
Indian generals
Indian Hindus
Year of death uncertain
17th-century deaths
Shivaji